Ahmad Fuzi bin Abdul Razak (born 8 January 1949) is a Malaysian diplomat who has served as the 8th Yang di-Pertua Negeri of Penang since 1 May 2021.

Education 
Ahmad Fuzi attended primary and secondary education in Penang. He obtained a degree of Bachelor of Arts (with Honours) from the University of Malaya in 1972 and a Certificate in Diplomacy from the University of Oxford in 1974.

Tun Fuzi had his primary education at King Edward VII School in Taiping and Stowell School Bukit Mertajam, secondary education at the Bukit Mertajam High School, higher secondary education at the Anderson School Ipoh before graduating from the University of Malaya in 1972 with a Bachelor of Arts (Hons). He also attended the UK Foreign Service Programme at Oxford University where he obtained a Certificate in Diplomacy in 1974. Source: Official Govt. of Penang website: https://www.penang.gov.my/index.php/en/tyt

Career

Public service 
Ahmad Fuzi joined Malaysian Administrative and Diplomatic Service in 1972 as an assistant secretary in the Ministry of Foreign Affairs. Throughout the years, he served as a diplomat in Moscow, The Hague, Canberra and Washington, D.C. He headed Malaysian High Commission in Dhaka from 1992 to 1994. He served as Deputy Secretary-General from 1997 to 2001, as Secretary-General until 2006 and as Ambassador-at-Large until 2009.

As Secretary-General, he played a prominent role in organizing the NAM Summit and the OIC Summit, both in 2003, and the ASEAN Summit and related summits in 2005. He also led Malaysian delegation to the ASEAN Senior Officials Meeting and the Senior Officials Meeting of the bilateral Joint Commissions between Malaysia and the relevant countries.

Business and economic development 
After leaving public service, Ahmad Fuzi has served as chairman and director in various companies, including ACE Holdings Berhad, ACE Investment Bank Limited, Takaful Malaysia Berhad, asiaEP Resources Berhad, Seremban Engineering Berhad, Puncak Niaga Holdings Berhad and Maybank Islamic Berhad.

Ahmad Fuzi has also been Secretary-General of WIEF from 2008. As such, he was known for the success of WIEF forums all over the world such as London, Dubai, Islamabad, Kuwait, Astana, Jakarta, with the last WIEF Forum held in Kuching in 2017 and the only WIEF Roundtable Series held in Kota Kinabalu in 2020.

Governor of Penang 
Penang Chief Minister Chow Kon Yeow, on His Majesty's behalf, declared Ahmad Fuzi's appointment as the next Governor on 12 April 2021. He took the governorship from his predecessor, Abdul Rahman Abbas, upon his swearing in on 1 May 2021.

Family 
Ahmad Fuzi is married to Khadijah Mohd. Nor and has two children.

Honours 
Ahmad Fuzi was bestowed with the following honours:

  :
 Member of the Order of the Defender of the Realm (AMN) (1979)
 Companion of the Order of Loyalty to the Crown of Malaysia (JSM) (1999)
 Commander of the Order of Loyalty to the Crown of Malaysia (PSM) – Tan Sri (2003)
  Grand Commander of the Order of the Defender of the Realm (SMN) – Tun (2021)
  :
 Officer of the Order of the Defender of State (DSPN) – Dato' (1999)
 Companion of the Order of the Defender of State (DMPN) – Dato' (2002)
  Knight Grand Commander of the Order of the Defender of State (DUPN) – Dato' Seri Utama (2021)
  :
  Grand Commander of the Order of Kinabalu (SPDK) – Datuk Seri Panglima (2021)

Foreign honour
 :
 Second Class Member of the Order of Paduka Seri Laila Jasa (DSLJ) – Dato Seri Laila Jasa (2014)

References

Governors of Penang
Living people
1949 births
High Commissioners of Malaysia to Bangladesh
People from Penang
Malaysian Muslims
Malaysian diplomats
Commanders of the Order of Loyalty to the Crown of Malaysia
Companions of the Order of Loyalty to the Crown of Malaysia
Grand Commanders of the Order of the Defender of the Realm
Members of the Order of the Defender of the Realm
University of Malaya alumni
Grand Commanders of the Order of Kinabalu